The SFR Airspace monitoring and management system was the first Airspace monitoring and management system of the Swiss Air Force.

History

After the second world war it became apparent that the rapid development of air defense of Switzerland without a comprehensive air surveillance was unrealistic. However, Switzerland lacked knowledge of such systems and the victorious  Allies of World War II restricted both the sharing of knowledge and the sale of new radar equipment. Only the LGR-1 Radar was available. It was used to find suitable locations for the radar antennas of the SFR system.

The core of the SFR system was the French ER-200 early warning and guidance radar from the Société Française Radioélectrique. The system was ordered on 31 January 1952, in a larger number of radar systems, radar components from which were compiled by its own architecture. From 1955 to 1966, a school complex in Dübendorf (the Radar Doerfli ("Radar village") on the training site Dürrbach Rüti bei Riggisberg), one on the top of Bütschelegg (above Bern-Belp) and the plants on 4 height locations (mountain peaks) were formed for the first radar aerial surveillance system of Switzerland. The airspace monitoring system also included an aboveground command center in Dübendorf as well as an underground command center on the Tschorren above the Brünig Pass. In these command centers put the data of the radarsites together to a national wide air surveillance picture. From these command centers where also the own aircraft guided by tactical fighter controllers.

Development of the high locations was difficult and led to delays in the start-up. Experience with chaff has already been done and could be considered. However, the recording from flying objects in the area with constant radar echo (for example, in large-scale radar echo of a mountain which is located in the line of sight of the radar behind the flying object) is problematic and could only be improved by improve the electronic components. As such, the SFR system was only in use for about 10 years before it was replaced by the FLORIDA Airspace monitoring and management system.

An antenna and the model of a height search antenna is in the Flieger-Flab-Museum at Dübendorf.

Specifications

The radar system operates in S-band ( 2910 - 3350 MHz) and scans with two rotating antennas  airspace two-dimensional (by side and distance). A separate height fingering radar is used to measure individually the altitude of selected targets. For the vertical radar coverage, a third radar antenna is required: a double antenna (Back to Back) for the height overlap "deep - medium" in place of the originally planned "Station Couverture Basse".
Magnetronsender: 3200 MHz
Peak power: 500 kW
Pulse width: 1 microsecond
Range: 220 km
Locations: 4 fixed units and one mobile unit
Elements per site: 1 each single antenna Doppler antenna (back to back), height finder antenna, 4 transmitter / receiver, 3 clutter suppression devices MIT

See also 
 LGR-1 Radar
 Target allocation radar TPS-1E
 FLORIDA Airspace monitoring and management system
 TAFLIR
 FLORAKO

References

Flieger-Flab-MuseumDübendorf
 Alber Wüst: Die Schweizerische Fliegerabwehr.  2011, 
    SFR ER220  in "Militärische Dänkmäler im Bereich Luftwaffe".  Page 13 &14
" Zur Geschichte der Radarüberwachung in der Schweiz" 16.January 2017 :de:Walter Dürig (Offizier) Pages 2–5
"Gespräch mit Alfons Haltmeier"  13.September 2013  Walter Dürig  Picture of the System on Mount Pilatus (LO) on Page 6
  Einsatzzentralen der Luftwaffe   23.Jun 2015 Oberst (aD) Rudolf Wiki , Hinwil  Page 27-30

External links
  B/W Pictures of the SRF-Radar ER-220 System

Swiss Air Force
Military of Switzerland
Ground radars